Libertà is an Italian newspaper published in Piacenza, Italy.

The newspaper, which was first published in 1883, is one of the country's oldest still in circulation. As of 2020, its editor is Pietro Visconti.

References

External links
 Official website

1883 establishments in Italy
Italian-language newspapers
Newspapers established in 1883
Daily newspapers published in Italy